Cory Siermachesky (born 20 August 1969) is a Canadian retired high jumper.

He finished fourth at the 1994 Commonwealth Games, in a new career best jump of 2.28 metres.

References

1969 births
Living people
Canadian male high jumpers
Athletes (track and field) at the 1991 Pan American Games
Athletes (track and field) at the 1994 Commonwealth Games
Athletes (track and field) at the 1995 Pan American Games
Commonwealth Games competitors for Canada
Pan American Games track and field athletes for Canada
20th-century Canadian people
21st-century Canadian people